Hippocampus casscsio, the Beibu Bay seahorse, is a species of marine fish of the family Syngnathidae. It is found off the coast of Hainan, China, and from sites around Beibu Bay/the Gulf of Tonkin. It is expected to consume small benthic and planktonic crustaceans such as copepods, shrimps, and mysids, similar to other seahorses. This species is ovoviviparous, with males brooding eggs in a brood pouch before giving birth to live young.

References

Further reading
WoRMS
iSeahorse
IUCN Seahorse, Pipefish & Stickleback Specialist Group

casscsio
Fish described in 2016
Marine fish